The Chucapaca mine is one of the largest gold mines in Peru and in the world. The mine is located in the south of the country in the Cusco Region. The mine has estimated reserves of 4.3 million oz of gold and 34.6 million oz of silver.

See also 
List of mines in Peru 

Zinc mining

References 

Gold mines in Peru